B with stroke (majuscule: Ƀ, minuscule: ƀ) is a letter of the Latin alphabet, formed from B with the addition of a bar, which can be through either the ascender or the bowl. It is used as a phonetic symbol to represent to transcribe the sound .

 is also a letter of the alphabets of the Rade, Jarai and Katu languages of Vietnam, the Panamanian spelling of the Northern Embera language, and is used in standardized texts in Old Saxon for [v] as well as in reconstructed forms of Proto-Germanic.

Unicode

The minuscule form has been present in Unicode since version 1 (1991), but the majuscule form was not added until version 5 (2006).

Bitcoin
Before the introduction of the Unicode symbol, ₿ (U+20BF), for the popular cryptocurrency Bitcoin, the symbol for the Thai baht, ฿ (U+0E3F), had sometimes been used. However, this caused possible confusion with the baht while Ƀ had no other uses related to currency. Therefore, Ƀ had been proposed as a substitute.

References

Latin letters with diacritics
Phonetic transcription symbols